Captain Bernard Armitage Warburton Warburton-Lee, VC (13 September 1895 – 10 April 1940) was a senior officer in the Royal Navy and a recipient of the Victoria Cross, the highest award for gallantry in the face of the enemy that can be awarded to British and Commonwealth forces.

Naval career
Warburton-Lee attended the British Army's Staff College, Camberley, from 1931 to 1932, where Brian Horrocks, later a lieutenant general and a corps commander, was among his fellow students. Horrocks wrote that it "was the practice for a naval officer to join the course for the final year, and our sailor turned out to be that remarkable all-rounder Warburton-Lee who won the V.C. at Narvik".

Spanish Civil War
In 1936, due to the outbreak of the Spanish Civil War and because there was fear of social unrest in the naval station, the Foreign Office in London organized a ship to repatriate the remaining British citizens and on 22 July 1936 , captained by Warburton-Lee, departed from Ferrol in northwestern Spain for Britain.

Second World War
Warburton-Lee was 44 years old and a captain when the following action took place during the Second World War, for which he was awarded the Victoria Cross.

On 10 April 1940 in Ofotfjord, Narvik, Norway, in the First Battle of Narvik, Captain Warburton-Lee of  commanded the British 2nd Destroyer Flotilla, consisting of five destroyers (HMS Hardy, Havock, Hostile, Hotspur and Hunter), in a surprise attack on German destroyers and merchant ships in a blinding snowstorm. This attack was successful, but was almost immediately followed by an engagement with five more German destroyers, during which Captain Warburton-Lee was mortally wounded by a shell which hit Hardys bridge. For his exploits in this engagement he was posthumously awarded Britain's highest decoration for valour in combat, the Victoria Cross. During the Second World War, only 23 Victoria Crosses were awarded to members of the Royal Navy and Royal Naval Reserve, of whom only approximately 11 survived. In 1942 he was also, posthumously, awarded the Norwegian War Cross.

VC citation
Bernard Warburton-Lee's VC citation reads as follows:

This was the first VC to be gazetted in the Second World War.

Personal life
Warburton-Lee married Elizabeth Campbell Swinton, the daughter of Captain George Swinton of Kimmerghame (see Clan Swinton), on 9 October 1924.

References

Bibliography

External links
Royal Navy Officers 1939−1945
CWGC entry

1895 births
1940 deaths
Royal Navy personnel killed in World War II
British World War II recipients of the Victoria Cross
Graduates of the Staff College, Camberley
People from Wrexham
Recipients of the War Cross (Norway)
Royal Navy officers of World War I
Royal Navy officers of World War II
Royal Navy recipients of the Victoria Cross
Welsh recipients of the Victoria Cross
Welsh military personnel
Burials in Norway